A large number of ships of the French Navy have borne the name Argonaute in honour of the mythological navigators argonauts. Among them:

 , a 50-gun ship of the line, personal ship of Emmanuel-Auguste de Cahideuc, Comte Dubois de la Motte
 , a 46-gun ship of the line, lead ship of her class
 , a 74-gun ship of the line, razéed to a 42-gun ship in 1794 and renamed Flibustier, out of service in 1795
 , a 74-gun ship of the line that took part in the Battle of Trafalgar
 Argonaute (1806), formerly the Spanish Vencedor of 78 guns
 , a ship of the line launched in 1840 but never commissioned
 , a torpedo boat
 , a prototype submarine
 , a submarine of the Aréthuse type (1958), now a museum
 , a ship specialised in rescue and decontamination

Sources and references 
 Les bâtiments ayant porté le nom d'Argonaute, netmarine.net

French Navy ship names